Kreshchenka is a rural locality (a village) in Vostretsovsky Selsoviet, Burayevsky District, Bashkortostan, Russia. The population was 5 as of 2010. There is 1 street.

Geography 
Kreshchenka is located 28 km southwest of Burayevo (the district's administrative centre) by road. Arslanbekovo is the nearest rural locality.

References 

Rural localities in Burayevsky District